Gomantak Maratha Samaj is a Hindu community found in the Indian state of Goa. They are known as Nutan Maratha Samaj in the Sindhudurg district of Maharashtra and Naik Maratha Samaj in Maharashtra, Uttara Kannada district of Karnataka, also Telangana respectively.

Origin
Gomantak Maratha is a relatively new ameliorative name adopted by a community of traditional Hindu temple servants. They were previously known by the following names:

Kalavantin/ Kulambini
Those who participated in music and singing were known as Kalavantini, literally meaning an artiste, they enjoyed a high status in the community.
Those who maintained the temple lamps, Palanquin, and held Chamara (Chavar in Konkani) were known as Bhavins, literally a pious lady.

The Kalavant women (sometimes called as Naikinn) as a custom became mistresses of Brahmin men who paid a huge sum of money to her mother. They also practiced prostitution.

Devli
Etymologically Devli, the word Devli is derived from the word Devul or Dev meaning God. So Devlis are those who were dedicated or devoted to the temple or to God. The duties of Devli males (Jyotkar) included lighting the temple lamps and mashal (torch), hold Devdanda, act as temple attendants (kathkar), also some were temple architects (Nayak) and  play the ritual musical instruments like Mahavadya, Panchavadya, Ranavadya.

Chedvaan, Chede, Bandi, Farjand
They were not always connected to the temple but with the Brahmin landlords (Bhatkars), at whose residences they performed all types of household work.

Perni
Their main occupation was acrobatics. They used to perform Jagar (a form of acrobatics) as the main source of their livelihood and held a lower status in the community.

History
The temple prostitution system was prevalent in Goa since times immemorial. The Kalawantin community finds references throughout Goan history. From ancient times, Hindu Kshatriya widows originally sought shelter in the temples if they did not commit Sati after the husband's death. These widows would then become the mistresses of the Brahmins. Any resulting illegitimate daughters would also be sold by their mothers to become mistresses of Brahmins, while the illegitimate sons would become temple servants and entertainers.

The Portuguese called them bailadeiras (dancers). In 1598, the Viceroy  passed a law on behalf of King Philip I of Portugal that prohibited members of the community from entering the Velhas Conquistas on the grounds that the community members "perform many obscene dances, sing dirty songs and do all sorts of things that only reflect a diabolic state."
 
During British colonial rule, many Kalawantin community members moved for economic reasons to the city of Bombay and other areas of British India. Most of these emigrants followed Hindustani classical music gharanas to improve their art and talent. Those who remained in Goa began organizing themselves after the Portuguese First Republic period. In 1910, Rajaram Painginikar started Kalawantin Movement from Poinguinim village in Goa. In 1917, Maratha Gayan Samaj (Maratha Singers Society) was formed in Kakode. In 1937, the Gomantak Maratha Samaj (G.M.S.) was formed under the leadership of Rajaram Panginikar. The main functions of the G.M.S. are as follows:
To promote the education of its members.
To arrange marriages of their children within the community.
Other community welfare activities for their community.

Following the Annexation of Goa, the G.M.S. was formally included by the Government of Goa as a Reserved category.

Notable members
 Mangeshkar Family
 Kishori Amonkar
 Dayanand Bandodkar
 Shashikala Kakodkar
 Kesarbai Kerkar
 Moghubai Kurdikar
 Raghunath Mashelkar
 Vithal Nagesh Shirodkar

See also
Konkani people
Malvani
Devadasis
Harijans

References

Goan society
Hinduism in Goa
Social groups of Goa